is a Japanese football player for Kataller Toyama.

Club statistics
Updated to end of 2018 season.

References

External links

Profile at Ehime FC

1989 births
Living people
Komazawa University alumni
Association football people from Osaka Prefecture
Japanese footballers
J1 League players
J2 League players
J3 League players
Ventforet Kofu players
Gainare Tottori players
Ehime FC players
Kataller Toyama players
Association football defenders
Universiade gold medalists for Japan
Universiade medalists in football
Medalists at the 2011 Summer Universiade